The following is a list of expatriate players who have played in the KBO League baseball in South Korea.

Players

References

 
KBO League player, foreign